The 2014 Roma Maxima was the 74th edition of the international one-day cycling race Roma Maxima and the 2nd under the new name (the race was previously held as Giro del Lazio). The race started and ended in Rome.

References

Roma Maxima
Roma Maxima
Roma Maxima
Roma Maxima